Milan Antolković (born 27 September 1915 in Zagreb, died 27 June 2007 in Zagreb) was a Croatian footballer who played international football for both the Croatian and Royal Yugoslav national teams.

Football career

Player
He began his career with NK Maksimir before moving to Građanski Zagreb in 1932. He also had a short spell with SK Bata Borovo in 1933. He played with Građanski as a striker until its disbanding in 1945.

During his international career with the Kingdom of Yugoslavia he was capped 8 times, scoring one goal. During the existence of the Independent State of Croatia he was capped for the Croatian national team 10 times, scoring three goals.

Managerial
He was later a manager. His most famous managerial work may have been with Dinamo Zagreb with whom he won the Yugoslav Cup in 1960 and took to the Inter-Cities Fairs Cup finals in 1963. He won the Franjo Bučar State Award for Sport in 2003. He also coached SW Bregenz and SC Tasmania 1900 Berlin.

Table tennis career
He played for the Yugoslav national table tennis team during the 1933 Swaythling Cup.

References

External sources

Milan Antolković at the Serbia national football team website 

1915 births
2007 deaths
Footballers from Zagreb
Association football forwards
Yugoslav footballers
Yugoslavia international footballers
Croatian footballers
Croatia international footballers
Dual internationalists (football)
HŠK Građanski Zagreb players
Yugoslav First League players
Yugoslav football managers
Croatian football managers
GNK Dinamo Zagreb managers
Yugoslavia national football team managers
Schwarz-Weiß Bregenz managers
NK Osijek managers